Yersinia enterocolitica is a Gram-negative, bacillus-shaped bacterium, belonging to the family Yersiniaceae. It is motile at temperatures of 22–29°C (72–84°F), but becomes nonmotile at normal human body temperature. Y. enterocolitica infection causes the disease yersiniosis, which is an animal-borne disease occurring in humans, as well as in a wide array of animals such as cattle, deer, pigs, and birds. Many of these animals recover from the disease and become carriers; these are potential sources of contagion despite showing no signs of disease. The bacterium infects the host by sticking to its cells using trimeric autotransporter adhesins.

The genus Yersinia includes 20 species: Y. aldovae, Y. aleksiciae, Y. bercovieri, Y. canariae, Y. enterocolitica, Y. entomophaga, Y. frederiksenii, Y. hibernica, Y. intermedia, Y. kristensenii, Y. massiliensis, Y. mollaretii, Y. nurmii, Y. pekkanenii, Y. pestis, Y. pseudotuberculosis, Y. rohdei, Y. ruckeri, Y. similis, and Y. wautersii. Among them, only Y. pestis, Y. pseudotuberculosis, and certain strains of Y. enterocolitica are of pathogenic importance for humans and certain warm-blooded animals, whereas the other species are of environmental origin and may, at best, act as opportunists. However, Yersinia strains can be isolated from clinical materials, so they have to be identified at the species level.

Y. enterocolitica is a heterogeneous group of strains, which are traditionally classified by biotyping into six biogroups on the basis of phenotypic characteristics, and by serotyping into more than 57 O serogroups, on the basis of their O (lipopolysaccharide or LPS) surface antigen. Five of the six biogroups (1B and 2–5) are regarded as pathogens. However, only a few of these serogroups have been associated with disease in either humans or animals. Strains that belong to serogroups O:3 (biogroup 4), O:5,27 (biogroups 2 and 3), O:8 (biogroup 1B), and O:9 (biogroup 2) are most frequently isolated worldwide from human samples. However, the most important Y. enterocolitica serogroup in many European countries is serogroup O:3 followed by O:9, whereas the serogroup O:8 is mainly detected in the United States.

Y. enterocolitica is widespread in nature, occurring in reservoirs ranging from the intestinal tracts of numerous mammals, avian species, cold-blooded species, and even from terrestrial and aquatic niches. Most environmental isolates are avirulent; however, isolates recovered from porcine sources contain human pathogenic serogroups. In addition, dogs, sheep, wild rodents, and environmental water may also be a reservoir of pathogenic Y. enterocolitica strains. Human pathogenic
strains are usually confined to the intestinal tract and lead to enteritis/diarrhea.

Signs and symptoms
The portal of entry is the gastrointestinal tract. The organism is acquired usually by insufficiently cooked pork or contaminated water, meat, or milk. In recent years Y. enterocolitica has increasingly been causing smaller outbreaks via Ready-To-Eat (RTE) vegetables. Acute Y. enterocolitica infections usually lead to mild self-limiting enterocolitis or terminal ileitis and adenitis in humans. Symptoms may include watery or bloody diarrhea and fever, resembling appendicitis or salmonellosis or shigellosis. After oral uptake, Yersinia species replicate in the terminal ileum and invade Peyer's patches. From here they can disseminate further to mesenteric lymph nodes causing lymphadenopathy. This condition can be confused with appendicitis, so is called pseudoappendicitis. In immunosuppressed individuals, they can disseminate from the gut to the liver and spleen and form abscesses.  Because Yersinia species are siderophilic (iron-loving) bacteria, people with hereditary hemochromatosis (a disease resulting in high body iron levels) are more susceptible to infection with Yersinia (and other siderophilic bacteria). In fact, the most common contaminant of stored blood is Y. enterocolitica. See yersiniosis for further details.

Treatment
Yersiniosis is usually self-limiting and does not require treatment. For sepsis or severe focal infections, especially if associated with immunosuppression, the recommended regimen includes doxycycline in combination with an aminoglycoside. Other antibiotics active against Y. enterocolitica include trimethoprim-sulfamethoxasole, fluoroquinolones, ceftriaxone, and chloramphenicol. Y. enterocolitica is usually resistant to penicillin G, ampicillin, and cefalotin due to beta-lactamase production, but multi-drug resistant strains have been reported in Europe.

Prognosis
Y. enterocolitica infections are sometimes followed by chronic inflammatory diseases such as arthritis, erythema nodosum, and reactive arthritis. This is most likely because of some immune-mediated mechanism.

Y. enterocolitica seems to be associated with autoimmune Graves-Basedow thyroiditis.
Whilst indirect evidence exists, direct causative evidence is limited.
Y. enterocolitica is probably not a major cause of this disease, but may contribute to the development of thyroid autoimmunity arising for other reasons in genetically susceptible individuals.
Y. enterocolitica infection has also been suggested to be not the cause of autoimmune thyroid disease, but rather an associated condition, with both sharing a common inherited susceptibility.
More recently, the role for Y. enterocolitica has been disputed.

References

External links

 Yersinia enterocolitica genomes and related information at PATRIC, a Bioinformatics Resource Center funded by NIAID
 Yersinia enterocolitica in the NCBI Taxonomy Browser
 Type strain of Yersinia enterocolitica subsp. enterocolitica at BacDive – the Bacterial Diversity Metadatabase

Bacteria described in 1939
enterocolitica